Taiwan Province is a nominal administrative division of the People's Republic of China (PRC). The PRC constitution defines Taiwan as part of its territories despite the fact that the PRC has never controlled any part of Taiwan since the PRC's establishment in 1949. Taiwan is currently administered by the Republic of China (ROC).

The political status of Taiwan is complex. Following the Chinese Civil War, the PRC considers itself the successor state of the pre-1949 ROC and the sole legitimate government of "China" since its founding on 1October 1949, and claims Taiwan and the Penghu Islands as part of its territory under the One China principle.  However, the PRC has never administered Taiwan: the Taiwan Area, including all of the contemporary Taiwan Province, is currently administered by the government of the Republic of China (ROC), which disputes the PRC's claims.

The People's Republic of China was founded in 1949 near the end of the Chinese Civil War. While by 1950 it had obtained control over most of the territories previously administered by the Republic of China (ROC), it never gained control of an area made up of Taiwan. Instead, Taiwan has been administered by the ROC (which is now commonly known as "Taiwan") since the end of World War II in 1945, continuing through the Chinese Civil War and past the foundation of the People's Republic of China in 1949.

While the PRC claims Taiwan as part of its territory, it recognises Taiwan is outside its actual territory of control and does not maintain a government in exile for Taiwan Province. However, its CCP National Congress reserves a position for legislators that represent Taiwan, most of whom are of Taiwanese descent but were born in and are residents of mainland China, except for one representative (Lu Li'an) who was born and grew up in Taiwan. The Taiwan Affairs Office of the State Council of the People's Republic of China is the part of the PRC government that has responsibility over Taiwan-related matters, but it is neither tasked with, nor presented as, a shadow administration for Taiwan. Instead, the ROC government, which actually controls Taiwan Province, is referred to by the PRC as the "Taiwan authorities".

In 1979, the PRC proposed that under a hypothetical unification Taiwan would become a Special Administrative Region  rather than a province.

Usage in the People's Republic of China 

Despite formal status of a province, the term "Taiwan Province" is now only used in the most formal circumstances such as National People's Congress. In domestic contexts that excludes Hong Kong and Macau, the number of provinces (including autonomous regions, municipalities) is always stated as 31 (Taiwan is not counted).

In official PRC statistics involving Taiwan, "Taiwan Area" is widely used instead, corresponding to the ROC's Free Area of the Republic of China, and is treated together with Special Administrative Regions rather than other provinces.  Taiwan Province only includes Taiwan and associated islands such as  the Pescadores Islands, but "Taiwan Area" (the same as "Taiwan Area" as used by ROC, a.k.a.) is all area administered by Taipei and includes Fujian islands such as Kinmen, Matsu, as well as (at least in principle) Pratas Island (Tungsha/Dongsha) (part of Cijin District, Kaoshiung; claimed as part of Guangdong Province by the PRC) and Taiping Islands (assigned to Kaoshiung by ROC, and to Sansha and Hainan by PRC).  In 2017 Xinhua News Agency issued guidelines mandating no scare quotes for all members of local governments of Taiwan authorities (except Fujian and Lienchiang) and preferring the term "Taiwan Area" over the term "Taiwan Province, People's Republic of China", since the latter does not include the Kinmen and Matsu islands.

Administrative divisions

Maps published by the PRC show Taiwan Province and its subdivisions in accordance with its pre-1949 boundaries. Until recently, the ROC adopted an analogous practice of depicting mainland administrative boundaries in maps the way they were in 1949, to demonstrate that the ROC did not recognise the PRC government, or any boundary changes enacted by them since 1949, as legitimate.

Even before this, the practice of not recognizing any boundary changes made to Taiwan had ended. For example, New Taipei is accepted instead of Taipei County, and the merging of Kaohsiung City and Kaohsiung County is accepted on all maps published by PRC entities. Maps published in PRC do not treat borders between Taiwan Province (Republic of China) and Special Municipalities as provincial borders, but county borders, and often do not mandate a capital for Taiwan at all. The borders between Kinmen and Matsu and rest of Fujian Province are never denoted as provincial borders let alone international.

The official databases of PRC do not show any internal divisions of Taiwan, all of them showing "data not yet available" (this no longer applies to Hong Kong and Macau).

As of 2018, PRC official map service Tianditu treats all six special municipalities as prefecture-level cities, all three provincial cities as county-level cities directly administered by the province, and all fourteen county-administered cities as subdistricts under each individual county's jurisdiction.

Politics

Legislative representation
Although Taiwan Province is not under PRC control, thirteen delegates are elected to represent Taiwan Province to the National People's Congress.

The election of these delegates for Taiwan Province is done in accordance with the Decision (from time to time made) of the relevant Session of relevant National People's Congress of the PRC on the number of deputies to the National People's Congress and the election of the deputies. For example, in 2002 that Decision was as follows:

Having regard to the relevant Decision, the Standing Committee of the National People's Congress adopts a "Plan for the Consultative Election of Deputies of Taiwan Province to the National People's Congress". The Plan typically provides that "the deputies will be elected in Beijing through consultation from among representatives sent by Taiwan compatriots in these provinces, autonomous regions, and municipalities directly under the Central Government and in the Chinese People's Liberation Army."

In the case of the 2002 election, the Standing Committee noted that there were more than 36,000 "Taiwan compatriots" in the 31 provinces, autonomous regions, and municipalities directly under the Central Government and the central Party, government and army institutions. It was decided that 122 representatives would participate in the conference for election through consultation. The number of representatives was allocated on the basis of the geographic distribution of Taiwan compatriots on the mainland and the standing committees of the people's congresses of the provinces, autonomous regions, and municipalities directly under the Central Government were responsible for making arrangements for the election of the representatives through consultation. The Standing Committee's Plan also provided that the election should be "conducted in a democratic manner".

After the latest election at the 13th National People's Congress, 13 of the Taiwan representatives for the National People's Congress are:
 Cai Peihui
 Ceng Liqun
 Chen Jun, Amis
 Chen Yunying, born in Taipei
 Fu Zhiguan
 Huang Zhixian, born in Mainland China to a mother from Tainan
 Liang Zhiqiang, born in Mainland China to parents from Miaoli County
 Liao Haiying
 Lin Qing, born in Taipei
 Xu Pei
 Zhang Xiaodong
 Zhang Xiong
 Zou Zhenqiu

Nomenclatures for the ROC government used by PRC

Since the PRC does not recognise the ROC as legitimate, PRC government and media refers to some ROC government offices and institutions using generic description which does not imply endorsement of the ROC's claim to be a legitimate government of either Taiwan or China. The precise replacements used are not officially designated, so the politically designated names for Taiwan have small variations across different source from within the PRC.

Since 21 July 2021, RTHK in Hong Kong has also imposed the same restrictions on its staff to prevent them from implying Taiwan as an independent state. 

For some cases, where the name does not significantly imply sovereignty, the name remains the same, such as for the Mainland Affairs Council, county and mayor. Even CGTN and many English-language state-run media uses the term "Executive Yuan".

Government bodies 
 Government as the Taiwan authorities
 Presidential Office Building as the Taiwan leader's office building
 Executive Yuan as the executive body
 Legislative Yuan as the legislative body
 Ministry of Economic Affairs as the economic affairs authority
 Ministry of Health and Welfare as the health and welfare authority
 Ministry of the Interior as the interior authority
 Ministry of Justice as the justice authority
 Ministry of Transportation and Communications as the transportation and communications authority
 Central Election Commission as the election commission
 Central Weather Bureau as the weather and earthquake monitoring agency

ROC Government officials 
 President of the Republic of China as the leader of the Taiwan Area
 Vice President as the deputy leader
 Premier (or President of the Executive Yuan) as the executive chief 
 Minister of Foreign Affairs as the chief official in charge of foreign exchange
 Minister of Health and Welfare as the chief of health and welfare authority
 Minister of the Mainland Affairs Council as the mainland affairs chief
 Minister of National Defense as the military chief
 Minister of Transportation and Communications as the chief of transportation and communications authority

Educational institutions
 National Taipei University as the Taipei University
 National Taiwan University as the Taiwan University
 National Taiwan Normal University as the Taiwan Normal University

Events
 Republic of China Presidential Election as the leadership elections in the Taiwan area

Demographics 

While demographic data for Taiwan Province published by the PRC government respects the census figures published by the ROC government for the territory, the PRC government does not recognise the ethnic classifications of Taiwanese Aborigines adopted by the ROC. Instead, the PRC government classifies all Taiwanese Aboriginese as Gaoshan people, one of the 56 recognized ethnicities of the PRC.

See also 

 Provinces of China
 Taiwan Province, Republic of China
 Free Area of the Republic of China
 Taiwan Affairs Office
 Political status of Taiwan

References

External links 
 Taiwan Affairs Office of the State Council 

Provinces of the People's Republic of China
Politics of Taiwan
1949 in international relations
Legal fictions